The Coat of Arms of Sarajevo (also known as the Seal of Sarajevo) is the coat of arms of the city of Sarajevo, the capital of Bosnia and Herzegovina.

Article 2 of the official act of the Sarajevo city council describes the seal as follows:

Article 3 describes the flag:

References

Year of establishment missing
Sarajevo
Culture in Sarajevo
History of Sarajevo
Sarajevo